The Smith Wildman and Jennie (Hearne) Brookhart House, now a part of the United Presbyterian Home, is a historic building located in Washington, Iowa, United States. It was listed on the National Register of Historic Places in 2005.  Smith Wildman Brookhart was a lawyer, and was elected twice to the United States Senate as a Republican.  He was a “fervent dry,” and fought the repeal of Prohibition while in the Senate.  He also was a member of a group of senators from the Midwest and West that fought for government assistance for farmers.  He married Jennie Hearne in 1897, and they had four sons and two daughters.

The Davenport architectural firm of Clausen & Clausen designed the house in a simple American Craftsman design, with an unadorned exterior and interior.  It was completed in 1910.  The two-story "fireproof" house is constructed of concrete, hollow ceramic tile, steel rods, steel mesh, and brick. Noteworthy is the double front porch.  A broad single story porch stretches the width of the main facade, while the separate central portion of the porch reaches to the second floor.  Originally the house was located on a small farm outside of town, but Washington grew to include the property.  It became the offices of the United Presbyterian Home in 1946.  The home's south wing, Sherman Hall, was built onto the back of the Brookhart house in the 1950s. Stewart Hall was added around 1980.

References

Houses completed in 1910
Houses in Washington County, Iowa
Washington, Iowa
National Register of Historic Places in Washington County, Iowa
Houses on the National Register of Historic Places in Iowa